David Selvarajah Vadiveloo is an Australian lawyer, human rights and education consultant, cultural broker and screen producer.

Vadiveloo received the 2005 Australian Human Rights Commission Award for Individual Community Achievement and was the youngest person to be Highly Commended for the Australian Human Rights Medal, recognising lifelong commitment and achievements in human rights. Vadiveloo is the Founder and Executive Director of the social justice, media and education agency Community Prophets. He leads the cultural safety and culturally responsive practice reform underway in schools that operate in Victoria's juvenile justice system and consults to high-profile Indigenous community and commercial organisations in Australia and the United States including the Mirarr Gundjeihmi Aboriginal Corporation and the Inupiat Education Department in Alaska. Vadiveloo's social justice films have been nominated for Australian Film Institute Awards in both the drama and documentary categories.

Vadiveloo is married to Inupiat screen producer, education consultant and cultural broker Rachel Naŋinaaq Edwardson.

Early life and education
Vadiveloo was born in Wagga Wagga, Australia, to a Tamil father and Anglo-Celtic mother. He holds a Bachelor of Laws and Bachelor of Arts from Monash University, Melbourne, Australia and a Graduate Diploma in Film and Television from the Victorian College of the Arts at University of Melbourne, Australia.

Awards
Vadiveloo's work in human rights, media and culturally responsive education saw him awarded the 2005 Australian Human Rights Commission Award for Individual Community Achievement, specifically for his work with Indigenous and marginalised peoples. In 2005 he was also the youngest person to be Highly Commended for the Australian Human Rights Medal, recognising lifelong commitment and achievements in human rights.
Vadiveloo's films and interactive screenworks have received numerous nominations and awards including the 2002 Canadian Golden Sheaf Award for Best International Documentary, the 2005 Australian Interactive Media Industry Association Award for Best Interactive Learning and 2009 Australian Film Institute nominations in both Drama and Documentary.

Career

Legal and human rights career
Vadiveloo began work as a solicitor and barrister in the Northern Territory of Australia in 1994. He worked on the successful Central Land Council Native Title Application, Hayes v Northern Territory, brought by the Arrernte people of the Alice Springs region.

In 1996, Vadiveloo was a policy advisor to the Federal Race Discrimination Commissioner of the Australian Human Rights Commission. He facilitated national community consultations with Indigenous and culturally and linguistically diverse (CALD) communities about the operation and effectiveness of the Australian Racial Discrimination Act. His consultations formed the basis of the 1996 State of the Nation Report.

Between 2001 and 2003 Vadiveloo worked alongside former Australian Human Rights Commissioner Chris Sidoti and Bill Barker, former Director of the Department of Foreign Affairs and Trade's Human Rights and Indigenous Issues section  as a trainer in the Australia-Indonesia Specialised Training Project II, facilitating human rights training programs with Indonesian NGO's, military and government employees in areas of race discrimination, torture and conflict resolution.

Since 2007, Vadiveloo and wife Rachel Naninaaq Edwardson have facilitated culturally responsive practice and social justice media programs in partnership with Indigenous and marginalised youth in the Northern Territory, Queensland, Victoria, NSW and Alaska. Their program in Cape York became the subject of the 2-part ABC Television documentary Voices From the Cape.

In 2008 at the request of the Legal Aid Commission of NSW, Vadiveloo and Edwardson devised and facilitated the Burn project with marginalised youth from linguistically and culturally diverse backgrounds in inner-city Sydney. The six-month project was a crime prevention initiative that resulted in the production of the Australian Film Institute nominated Burn film.

In 2013, Vadiveloo was Acting Chief Executive Officer of the Gundjeihmi Aboriginal Corporation. On behalf of the Corporation he drafted the landmark research agreement used for the Madjedbebe archaeological excavation which has changed the scientifically accepted date of modern human occupation in Australia. Vadiveloo continues his work as a consultant to the Gundjeihmi Aboriginal Corporation today.

In 2015 Vadiveloo and Edwardson devised and facilitated a culturally responsive education pilot program for youth in custody at the Parkville Youth Justice Facility in Melbourne, Australia. The program included a number of high profile artists including Archie Roach, Radical Son and Abdul Abdullah. and resulted in Vadiveloo leading the cultural safety and culturally responsive practice reform that is being implemented in all schools in youth justice facilities in the State of Victoria.

Film career
In 1998, after completing the Victorian College of the Arts Film and Television post-graduate degree, Vadiveloo returned to Alice Springs and established a media program at the Irrkerlantye Learning Centre, working with Aboriginal children from the Town Camps of Alice Springs and re-engaging them with schooling through media.,

Vadiveloo's documentary Trespass (2002), about the Mirrar leader Yvonne Margarula and her battle to stop the Jabiluka mine site, won multiple awards and his documentary Beyond Sorry (2004) about Australia's Stolen Generations premiered on Australia's ABC Television and was a festival favourite at the 2004 Sydney Film Festival.

Vadiveloo directed and co-produced Us Mob (2005), the first Aboriginal children's television series in Australia and the first interactive Indigenous television series in the world.

Two films written and directed by Vadiveloo were nominated at the 2009 Australian Film Institute Awards: the half-hour crime drama Burn (created with at-risk inner city youth) was nominated for Best Short Fiction Film and Voices from the Cape (which documented a program run by his company Community Prophets in the Aboriginal community of Aurukun in Cape York, Australia) was nominated for best documentary series. Vadiveloo received Best Director nominations for both films at the Australian Directors Guild Awards in 2010.

Vadiveloo founded the social justice, media and education agency Community Prophets in 2005. The company facilitates culturally responsive practice reform and produces and teaches film and television in partnership with marginalised communities.

Filmography
2012 Project Chariot – Producer, Editor (Dir: Rachel Naninaaq Edwardson) 
2012 Songline to Happiness – Producer (Dir: Danny Teece-Johnson) 
2009 The Voice of our Spirit – Editor (Dir: Rachel Naninaaq Edwardson) 
2008 Voices from the Cape – Writer, Director, co-Producer 
2008 Burn – Writer, Director
2005 Us Mob – Writer, Director, co-Producer 
2004 Beyond Sorry – Writer, Director, Producer 
2002 Bush Bikes – Writer, Director, Producer
2002 Jabiru 0886: Trespass Writer, Director, co-Producer
2001 Tales from a suitcase series 2 - Writer, Director
2001 Trespass - Director, Producer 
1999 Iwerre Atherrame - Writer, Director

Bibliography
Vadiveloo, David (2007). "A time for empowerment or a new digital divide? " in da Rimini, Francesca and d/Lux/MediaArts "A Handbook for Coding Cultures" (2007)
Ginsburg, Faye (2006) "Rethinking the Digital Age" in Toynbee, Jason & Hesmondhalgh, David (2008) "The media and social theory" p136

References

External links
Community Prophets
Us Mob
Burn
Voices from the Cape 
Living Next Door to Alice
Movie making project boosts school attendance
David Vadiveloo: grass roots reconciliation
Life Matters Feature Interview: David Vadiveloo
Aboriginal Town Camp School
Coding cultures
Mulka Media Centre

Living people
Date of birth missing (living people)
Australian film directors
Australian film producers
Place of birth missing (living people)
Monash Law School alumni
University of Melbourne alumni
People from Alice Springs
Lawyers from Melbourne
Year of birth missing (living people)